Trechus ovipennis is a species of ground beetle in the subfamily Trechinae. It was described by Victor Motschulsky in 1845.

References

ovipennis
Beetles described in 1845